These are the official results of the Women's Javelin Throw event at the 1987 World Championships in Rome, Italy. There were a total of 31 participating athletes, with the final held on Sunday September 6, 1987. All results were made with a rough surfaced javelin (old design).

Medalists

Schedule
All times are Central European Time (UTC+1)

Abbreviations
All results shown are in metres

Records

Qualification
 Held on Saturday 1987-09-05

Final

See also
 1982 Women's European Championships Javelin Throw (Athens)
 1984 Women's Olympic Javelin Throw (Los Angeles)
 1986 Women's European Championships Javelin Throw (Stuttgart)
 1988 Women's Olympic Javelin Throw (Seoul)
 1990 Women's European Championships Javelin Throw (Split)
 1992 Women's Olympic Javelin Throw (Barcelona)

References
 Results

J
Javelin throw at the World Athletics Championships
1987 in women's athletics